Jazz at Ann Arbor is a live album by jazz trumpeter Chet Baker which was recorded at the Masonic Temple in 1954 and released on the Pacific Jazz label.

Reception

Lindsay Planer of Allmusic states, "Chet Baker was arguably at the peak of his prowess when captured in a quartet setting at the Masonic Temple in Ann Arbor, MI, May 9, 1954".

Track listing
 "Line for Lyons" (Gerry Mulligan) - 6:45   
 "Lover Man" (James Sherman, Ram Ramirez, Jimmy Davis) - 5:45   
 "My Funny Valentine" (Lorenz Hart, Richard Rodgers) - 4:55
 "Maid in Mexico" (Russ Freeman) - 4:48   
 "Stella By Starlight" (Ned Washington, Victor Young) - 4:17   
 "My Old Flame" (Arthur Johnson, Sam Coslow) - 5:55   
 "Headline" (Jack Montrose) - 3:55   
 "Russ Job" (Freeman) - 5:55

Personnel
Chet Baker - trumpet
Russ Freeman - piano
Carson Smith - bass
Bob Neel - drums

References 

1955 live albums
Chet Baker live albums
Pacific Jazz Records live albums
Culture of Ann Arbor, Michigan